The mountain whitefish (Prosopium williamsoni) is one of the most widely distributed salmonid fish of western North America. It is found from the Mackenzie River drainage in Northwest Territories, Canada south through western Canada and the northwestern USA in the Pacific, Hudson Bay and upper Missouri River basins to the Truckee River drainage in Nevada and Sevier River drainage in Utah.

Description 
The body shape is superficially similar to the cyprinids, although it is distinguished by having the adipose fin of salmonids. The body is slender and nearly cylindrical in cross section, generally silver with a dusky olive-green shade dorsally. The scales possess pigmented borders, which are especially defined on the posterior end. Mountain Whitefish possess a forked homocercal tail. The short head has a small mouth underneath the snout. The short dorsal fin has 12–13 rays, with 11–13 for the anal fin, 10–12 for the pelvic fins, and 14–18 for the pectoral fins. Size has been recorded at up to 70 centimeters (28 inches) in length and a weight of 2.9 kilograms (6.4lb).

Life History 
The spawning season is from October to early December, when water temperatures are 2–6 °C. Mountain whitefish congregate in large schools on fall spawning runs and seek out areas of coarse gravels or cobbles at depths of at least 75 cm (30 inches), typically in shallow areas of small tributaries or shorelines of lakes. Their non-adhesive eggs are scattered along the substrate. The eggs then develop slowly through the winter (6–10 weeks), hatching in the early spring, generally in March. Mountain whitefish reach reproductive maturity at approximately three years old, females can produce as many as 4,000 eggs annually. Mountain whitefish typically live between 7–9 years in the wild.

Feeding 
Mountain Whitefish are demersal feeders, stirring up the substrate with pectoral and tail fins to expose insect larvae and other invertebrates, including snails, crayfish, and amphipods. Their main feeding time is in the evening, but they will also take drifting prey during the day. The mountain whitefish frequently feeds in the lower strata of streams, but populations may rise to the surface to prey on hatching insects, including mayflies. Mountain whitefish fry are a common food source for brook trout.

Ecology

Habitat 
The mountain whitefish are commonly found in mountain streams and lakes, favoring clear cold water and large deep pools of at least a meter's depth; the Lake Tahoe population lives just above the bottom in deeper water.

Range 
This species occurs throughout the western half of North America, as far north as the Mackenzie River (Canada) and the drainages of the Hudson Bay, in the Columbia River, upper Missouri River, upper Colorado River.

Conservation 
Mountain Whitefish have a secure conservation status. In many of the larger intermountain Western rivers, Mountain Whitefish are the only native salmonid. Mountain whitefish typically occur in high abundance, in the Snake River Basin in Idaho, Mountain Whitefish  abundance was found to be 1,257/100 m.

References

Prosopium
Freshwater fish of the United States
Fish of Canada
Fish of the Western United States
Fauna of the Northwestern United States
Fauna of California
Fauna of the Great Basin
Fauna of the Rocky Mountains
Taxa named by Charles Frédéric Girard
Fish described in 1856